Pasir Panjang (Jawi: ڤاسير ڤنجڠ) is a small town in Port Dickson District, Negeri Sembilan, Malaysia.

References

Port Dickson District
Towns in Negeri Sembilan